Violette Wautier (born October 10, 1993) is a Thai-Belgian singer-songwriter and actress. She made her singing debut with the audition on season 2 of The Voice Thailand in 2013. Then started off her career in both singing and acting. Her notable milestones are winning the Suphannahong Award for Best Supporting Actress in Thailand (2016) and her first English album Glitter and Smoke (2020).

Career
Wautier first appeared on season 2 of the singing competition The Voice Thailand in 2013, and went on to record songs for several films and television series. She appeared in productions with studio GTH/GDH, winning the Suphannahong Award for Best Supporting Actress for her performance in Heart Attack (2015), and co-starring in A Gift (2016). After several years under Universal Music Thailand, she left to become an independent artist and launched her own record label in 2018.

In 2018, Wautier released her first English-language single, "Drive". She followed up on the success of the hit with a second track named "Smoke" in the same year. "Smoke" went on to break the record for most views for an English song performed by a Thai artist on YouTube with over 60 million views. The single also ranked No. 1 in 8 countries, including Thailand, Singapore and Malaysia. Followed the success of "Smoke" and reunited with Universal Music Thailand after more than a year away from the recording studio, Wautier released her long-awaited third single in March 2020. Named after a small town in the south of France, "Brassac" is an alternative pop anthem inspired by Violette's own short-lived summer romance which what she called a "Call Me By Your Name" vibe. Her latest single "I'd Do it Again", an anthemic electro-pop which reminisces about her past love was set to be the lead single for her debut all-English album Glitter and Smoke, dropping on June 19, 2020.

Discography

Album

Soundtrack appearances

Music videos

Filmography

Films

Television series

MC
 Online 
 2022 : Friendsfly Ep1 On Air YouTube:GoyNattyDream Channel With Goy Arachaporn Pokinpakorn, อภิชญา พานิชตระกูล, นันทนัท ฐกัดกุล, บอสสอก กมลพิพัฒน์, Ammy, Namhom

References
https://th.wikipedia.org/wiki/วิโอเลต_วอเทียร์

External links
 
 

1993 births
Living people
People from Yokohama
Violette Wautier
Violette Wautier
Violette Wautier
Violette Wautier
Violette Wautier
Violette Wautier
Violette Wautier
Violette Wautier
Violette Wautier
Violette Wautier
Thai television personalities
Violette Wautier
Violette Wautier
Violette Wautier
Violette Wautier